Et in Arcadia ego (also known as The Arcadian Shepherds) is a painting by the Italian Baroque artist Giovanni Francesco Barbieri (Guercino), from c. 1618–1622. It is now on display in the Galleria Nazionale d'Arte Antica of Rome.

Description
The painting shows two young shepherds staring at a skull, with a mouse and a blowfly, placed onto a cippus with the words "Et in Arcadia ego" (Also in Paradise I am). This phrase is meant as a warning, that even in Arcadia/Paradise, death is always present. The phrase appears for the first time in art and architecture in this work. The iconography of the memento mori theme symbolised in art by the skull was rather popular in Rome and Venice since Renaissance times.

Elias L. Rivers suggested the phrase "Et in Arcadia ego" is derived from a line from Daphnis' funeral in Virgil's Fifth Eclogue Daphnis ego in silvis ("Daphnis was I amid the woods"), and that it referred to the dead shepherd within the tomb, rather than Death itself.

Mentioned for the first time in the collection of Antonio Barberini in 1644, the painting was later acquired by Colonna of Sciarra (1812), being attributed to Bartolomeo Schedoni until 1911. Nicolas Poussin also made two paintings on the topic of Et in Arcadia ego, less than two decades later.

The painting is connected with Guercino's The Flaying of Marsyas by Apollo in Palazzo Pitti (1618), where the same group of shepherds is present.

In literature and pop culture
Goethe's Italian Journey (1816) has "Et In Arcadia Ego" as its motto. Goethe viewed Guercino's painting in Cento (17 October 1786).

Hans Christian Andersen's "Improvisatoren" (1835) in chapter 13 two of the main characters discuss the painting.

William Faulkner's 1923 novel "The Sound And The Fury" mentions "Et in Arcadia Ego" in reference to Maury, a mentally disabled man.

"Et in Arcadia Ego" is the title of Book One of Evelyn Waugh's Brideshead Revisited (1945).

In Cormac McCarthy's novel Blood Meridian, it is the name of the Judge's gun.

Tom Stoppard's 1993 play Arcadia implicitly references Guercino's painting in its title and explicitly alludes to the painting in Act 1, scene 1. Lady Croom first mistranslates it slightly as "Here I am in Arcadia!", missing the implication of death, but Septimus later translates it correctly, in reference to the killing of pigeons (pp. 25–27). The painting works to foreground the play's focus on the beauty of life and the reality of death.

In the 2017 game Digimon Story Cyber Sleuth Hackers Memory "Even In Arcadia, There Am I"  is the name given to the 17th chapter.

"Et In Arcadia Ego" is the title of the ninth and tenth episodes of the first season of Star Trek: Picard

"Et In Arcadia Ego" is the title of the first episode of the first season of Brideshead Revisited

See also
Allegory
Baroque painting
Et in Arcadia ego by Nicolas Poussin
Memento mori

References

External links
Official Galleria Nazionale d'Arte Antica website

1622 paintings
Paintings by Guercino
Collections of the Galleria Nazionale d'Arte Antica
Paintings about death
Skulls in art
Insects in art
Mice and rats in art